Efird Building is a historic commercial building located at Burlington, Alamance County, North Carolina. It was built in 1919, and is a three-story, Gothic Revival style building.  The front facade is sheathed in white enamelled terra cotta tile. It housed a branch of Efird's Department Store based in Albemarle, North Carolina.

It was added to the National Register of Historic Places in 1984. It is located in the Downtown Burlington Historic District.

References

Commercial buildings on the National Register of Historic Places in North Carolina
Gothic Revival architecture in North Carolina
Commercial buildings completed in 1919
Buildings and structures in Burlington, North Carolina
National Register of Historic Places in Alamance County, North Carolina
Individually listed contributing properties to historic districts on the National Register in North Carolina